Jenny Greenteeth  a.k.a. Wicked Jenny or Ginny Greenteeth is  a figure in English folklore.  A river-hag, similar to Peg Powler or a grindylow, she would pull children or the elderly into the water and drown them.  The name is also used to describe pondweed or duckweed, which can form a continuous mat over the surface of a small body of water, making it misleading and potentially treacherous, especially to unwary children. With this meaning the name is common around Liverpool and southwest Lancashire.

Description and name
Jenny Greenteeth was often described as green-skinned, with long hair, and sharp teeth. She is called Jinny Greenteeth in Lancashire and North Staffordshire but in Cheshire and Shropshire she is called Wicked Jenny, Ginny Greenteeth or Jeannie Greenteeth.
She is also described as lurking in the upper branches of trees at night, although this may be a folklorist's confusion with the northern English Jinny-hewlet, a folk name for an owl.

Similar folk figures around the world
She is likely to have been an invention to frighten children from dangerous waters, similar in nature to the Slavic Rusalka, the Kappa in Japanese mythology, or Australia's Bunyip. Some  folklorists believe the tale recalls sacrificial practices. A similar figure in Jamaican folklore is called the River Mumma (River Mother). She is said to live at the fountainhead of large rivers in Jamaica sitting on top of a rock, combing her long black hair with a gold comb. She usually appears at midday and she disappears if she observes anyone approaching. However, if an intruder sees her first and their eyes meet, terrible things will happen to the intruder. A similar figure known as the Storm Hag (uncommonly also known as Jenny Greenteeth) appears in American folklore around Lake Erie, specifically in the urban legends of Erie, Pennsylvania, in which sailors use a paranormal being to explain the dangers and shipwrecks in the Erie Quadrangle (lake area around Erie County). The Storm Hag is said to be a green skinned woman with teeth like a shark's but green, as well as piercing yellow eyes, who rests on the bottom of the Lake, off the coast of Presque Isle and sings a song whenever a ship approaches.

When the sailors of the ship hear the song, the Storm Hag attacks the ship and crew with violent storms and waves, sinking and devouring them.

In popular culture
Jenny Greenteeth inspired the lake monster Meg Mucklebones in the 1985 Ridley Scott fantasy film Legend.

Jenny Green Teeth is the title character in a book of short stories, Jenny Green Teeth & Other Short Stories, by New Zealand-born English writer and Scholar Joel Hayward.

Jenny Green Teeth is also the main subject of a poem, "Welsh Maiden", by Joel Hayward in his collection, Lifeblood: A Book of Poems (2003); and is recalled by John Heath-Stubbs in his poem "The Green Man's Last Will and Testament", lamenting the eclipse of "the cruel nymphs/ Of the northern streams, Peg Powler of the Tees/ And Jenny Greenteeth of the Ribble".

In the novelette "Water Babies" by Simon Brown, Jenny Greenteeth is mentioned as being one of many names for a child-snatching water-demon.  In the novella, an Australian police officer investigates a series of drownings that turn out to be predatory attacks by a seal-like creature.

She appears in Terry Pratchett's The Wee Free Men, attacking the main character, Tiffany Aching, and her brother, Wentworth, near a shallow stream.

Jenny Greenteeth appears in a number of Dungeons & Dragons (5th Edition) adventure modules, including: DDEX01-08 "Tales Trees Tell" (2014), DDAL04-01 "Suits of the Mist" (2016), DDAL04-06 "The Ghost" (2016),  and DDAL04-14 "The Dark Lord" (2016).

Jenny Greenteeth appears in the story "Something Borrowed" and in the novel Summer Knight, and is mentioned in the novel  Proven Guilty, all by Jim Butcher; and is also mentioned in Ink Exchange by Melissa Marr.

She also appears in the story "Pretty Jennie Greenteeth" by Leife Shallcross, which won the 2016 Aurealis Award for best young adult short story.

In the sci-fi video game Remember Me, there is a mutated character named Johnny Greenteeth.

She appears in the short comic book story The Corpse by Mike Mignola.

See also

References

Citations

Bibliography

Katharine Briggs, An Encyclopeidia of Fairies, Hobgoblins, Brownies, Boogies, and Other Supernatural Creatures, "Jenny Greenteeth", p 242. 

 

English legendary creatures
Northumbrian folklore
Water spirits
Female legendary creatures
Hags